The Slănic is a left tributary of the river Buzău in Romania. It discharges into the Buzău in Săpoca. The following villages are situated along the river Slănic, from source to mouth: Terca, Luncile, Lopătari, Săreni, Mânzălești, Beșlii, Sârbești, Vintilă Vodă, Bodinești, Niculești, Podu Muncii, Petrăchești, Dogari, Arbănași, Gura Dimienii, Mărgăriți, Beceni, Valea Părului, Cărpiniștea, Izvoru Dulce, Fulga, Aldeni, Manasia, Căldărușa, Zărneștii de Slănic, Vlădeni, Cernătești and Săpoca.

Tributaries

The following rivers are tributaries to the river Slănic (from source to mouth):

Left: Zăganu, Brebu, Pârâul Sărat, Jghiab, Bisoca, Pecineaga, Câmpulungeanca, Homocioaia, Păru, Hotaru, Izvorul Dulce, Drăghici, Căldărești, Nucu
Right: Mociaru (or Mocearu), Jai Parashar, Vizuina, Ion, Ursu, Coca, Deleni, Jai, Pui, Balaur

References

Rivers of Romania
Rivers of Buzău County